Runivers is a site devoted to Russian culture and history. Runivers targets Russian speaking readers and those interested in Russian culture and history.

Runivers is an online library aimed to provide free access to authentic documents, books and texts related to Russian history, which were previously kept in major libraries and state archives. This project is not-profit.

The main body of the collection consists of facsimile copies of books and journals published before 1917 as well as archive photos and documents on the history and culture of Russia.

The digitalizing is supported by Transneft.

Collection

Books and publications
As of August 2010, Runivers claimed to contain over 1,500 books (high quality facsimile copies of original materials) mostly about Russian history. Also Runivers provides access to encyclopedias, document collections and photos. Many of the publications were not available for general public or were forbidden in Soviet Union (e.g. works of Russian philosophers).
The site includes a calendar with daily updates related to memorable events and people.

Photo collection
Runivers offers a collection of photographs taken by distinguished Russian photographers at the turn of the 20th century. Each photo gallery is accompanied by the biography of the photographer. The captions give information about the picture, objects on it and a place where it was taken.

There are galleries of:
 Dmitriev, Maksim Petrovich
 Den'er, Andrey Ivanovich
 Levitsky, Sergei Lvovich
 Karl Karlovich Bulla
 Barschevskiy, Ivan Fedorovich
 Karelin, Andrey Osipovich
 Karrik, Vasiliy Andreevich
 Prokudin-Gorsky, Sergey Mikhaylovich

Encyclopedias
Runivers features a military history encyclopedia combined from:
 Encyclopedic Military Lexicon. Sankt-Petersburg. 1852–1855 (Военный энциклопедический лексикон)
 Encyclopedia of Military and Marine Sciences. Sankt-Petersburg. 1883–1897 (Энциклопедия военных и морских наук)
 Military Enceclopedia. Published by Sytin. Sankt-Petersburg. 1911–1915 (Военная энциклопедия Сытина)

Other parts

 Complete collection of laws of Russian Empire
 Complete collection of military encyclopedias
 Many other dictionaries and encyclopedias
 Periodical. Journal "Questions of philosophy and psychology" was not available for general public in Soviet Union
 Brockhaus and Efron Encyclopedic Dictionary
 Archival documents collected by Russian Academy of Sciences and the Archeographic Commission
 Collection of books on military and marine history of Russia
 There are more than 3200 historical documents presented in the Runivers covering the following topics:
 Katyn Massacre
 Crimea: history as a part of Russian Empire
 Sevastopol and Russian Navy
 Molotov-Ribbentrop Pact
 Kuril Islands: history of question
 East Prussia: history and way to Russia
 Biographies and main works of Russian philosophers as well as their books, manuscript, letters, diaries.

See also

 Project Gutenberg
 Google Books
 Europeana
 World Digital Library
 Library of Congress

References

External links

 Runivers Homepage
 Private Label Rights eBooks

Book websites
Russian websites
Library 2.0
Ebook suppliers
Public domain books